Free Amazons of Darkover is an anthology of fantasy and science fiction short stories edited by Marion Zimmer Bradley. The stories are set in Bradley's world of Darkover. The book was first published by DAW Books (No. 657) in December 1985.

Contents
 Introduction: About Amazons by Marion Zimmer Bradley
 "The Oath of the Free Amazons" by Walter Breen
 "The Legend of Lady Bruna" by Marion Zimmer Bradley
 "Cast Off Your Chains" by Margaret Silvestri
 "The Banshee" by Sherry Kramer
 "On the Trail" by Barbara Armistead
 "To Open a Door" by P. Alexandra Riggs
 "The Meeting" by Nina Boal
 "The Mother Quest" by Diana L. Paxson
 "Child of the Heart" by Elisabeth Waters
 "Midwife" by Deborah Wheeler
 "Recruits" by Maureen Shannon
 "A Different Kind of Courage" by Mercedes R. Lackey
 "Knives" by Marion Zimmer Bradley
 "Tactics" by Jane M. H. Bigelow
 "This One Time" by Joan Marie Verba
 "Her Own Blood" by Margaret L. Carter
 "The Camel's Nose" by Susan Holtzer
 "Girls Will Be Girls" by Patricia Shaw-Mathews
 "Growing Pains" by Susan M. Shwartz
 "Oath of the Free Amazons: Terran, Techno Period" by Jaida n'ha Sandra

References
 
 
 

Darkover books
1985 anthologies
American anthologies
Fantasy anthologies
Works by Marion Zimmer Bradley
DAW Books books